Felix Beiersdorf (born 1 August 1998) is a German footballer who plays as a midfielder for FC Grimma.

Career
Beiersdorf made his professional debut for Wiener Neustadt in the Austrian First League on 29 September 2017, coming on as a substitute in the 84th minute for Fabian Miesenböck against TSV Hartberg, with the away match finishing as a 1–0 win.

Beiersdorf joined Leipziger SV Südwest in early 2019. He achieved promotion to the sixth-tier Landesliga with the club. Beiersdorf moved to FC Grimma of the fifth-tier Oberliga NOFV-Süd in January 2022.

References

External links
 
 
 
 
 Wiener Neustadt statistics

1998 births
Living people
Footballers from Leipzig
German footballers
Association football midfielders
Germany youth international footballers
Regionalliga players
2. Liga (Austria) players
RB Leipzig II players
RB Leipzig players
SC Wiener Neustadt players
BSG Chemie Leipzig (1997) players
ZFC Meuselwitz players
German expatriate footballers
German expatriate sportspeople in Austria
Expatriate footballers in Austria